SouthSide Works is an open-air retail, office, entertainment, and residential complex (often referred to as a lifestyle center) located on the South Side of the city of Pittsburgh, Pennsylvania, U.S. and just across the Monongahela River from the Pittsburgh Technology Center, the University of Pittsburgh and Carnegie Mellon University. In addition, the site has  of office space.

Site history

The site first was used for industry starting in 1893 and was a long time steel mill.
Ling-Temco-Vought (LTV) purchased Jones and Laughlin Steel Company in 1974 and merged with Republic Steel in 1985, which formed LTV Steel Co. LTV became the second largest steel producer in the nation. South Side Works was one of three LTV manufacturing facilities in Pittsburgh. One year following the merger, Republic Steel was forced to shut down as a result of foreign competition, high labor costs, and a lack of modern equipment. The property was abandoned until a city/county task force revitalized the area just south of downtown, and Pittsburgh-based Oxford Development Company and the University of Pittsburgh Medical Center constructed the state-of-the-art UPMC Sports Performance Complex on the most eastern boundary of the site.  The Pittsburgh Steelers, of the National Football League, and the NCAA Division I University of Pittsburgh Panthers football teams both utilize the complex's cutting-edge equipment and fields as their primary training facility.

On December 15, 2012 the megaplex theater on site was host to Tom Cruise, Robert Duvall, Rosamund Pike & David Oyelowo for the world premier of Jack Reacher.

Site development
There were environmental concerns associated with the site's redevelopment. The contaminants were PCBs and Iron and Cyanide Metals. The total actual cost of remediation was $265 million, and the project was funded by both the private and public sector.  In 1996–1997, the Urban Redevelopment Authority completed major remediation, yet continued to model and assess groundwater on the site for contamination. As of 1998, most of the assessment had concluded, and as a result the site was safe for redevelopment.  Developers, however, were required to clean up any contamination discovered during construction, and to implement a Health and Safety Plan.

Tax Increment Financing (TIF) was used, and adopted by the city, county, and school districts, to raise public funds for public infrastructure development. The TIF generated $25 million and was used for road and infrastructure improvements along with filling budget gaps for public parking structures. The site is a mix of office, medial, recreational, housing and retail use. The site generated private investment of $250 million, has 5,400 employment opportunities, 400 housing units, and 1,500 jobs were created during the initial development period.

Project Financing (projected)
 $23,427,461 City/URA Funding
 $16,250,000 Private Garage Funding
 $16,992,000 State Funding
 $12,525,000 Pittsburgh Water and Sewer Authority
 $25,000,000 Tax Increment Financing
 $11,000,000 HUD Section 108 Loans
 $1,500,000  HUD Brownfields Economic Development Initiative (BEDI) Grant
 $1,000,000  HUD Economic Development Initiative (EDI) Grant
 $7,245,039  Other Sources
 $103,666,500 Total

Anchor tenants
 American Eagle Outfitters Global Headquarters
 REI
 UPMC Sports Medicine Complex

Apparel
 Aerie
 Urban Outfitters

Restaurants & bars
 Hofbräuhaus
 The Cheesecake Factory
 McCormick & Schmick's
 Qdoba Mexican Grill

Further plans
A riverfront pavilion is also planned for hosting smaller concerts by touring groups as well as the local Pittsburgh Symphony Orchestra.

A 200-room hotel and 150 unit condo are also planned for the site.

References

Other 
 New American Music Union

External links

 Pittsburgh's Southside Works
 Pittsburgh Post-Gazette spotlight on Southside Work's apparel retailers
 Pittsburgh Tribune-Review detail of the overall project

Shopping malls in Metro Pittsburgh
Redeveloped ports and waterfronts in the United States
Lifestyle centers (retail)